The Alabama High School Athletic Association (AHSAA), based in Montgomery, is the governing body for interscholastic athletics and activities programs for public schools in Alabama.

The AHSAA is a member National Federation of State High School Associations since 1924.

The AHSAA merged with the Alabama Interscholastic Athletic Association in 1968, forming one high school athletic association for the State of Alabama in accordance with a court order relating to athletics. The AIAA had previously governed athletics at segregated African-American schools.

The AHSAA sponsors state championships programs in 13 boys and 13 girls sports: Baseball, Softball, Basketball, Football, Cross Country,   Soccer, Swimming and Diving, Track and Field, Tennis, Volleyball, Wrestling, Cheerleading and Indoor Track.

While the AHSAA is the primary sanctioning organization for high school sports in Alabama (and the only one allowed for public schools), it is not the only such organization. The Alabama Independent School Association sanctions athletics for approximately 40 private schools throughout the state. Other smaller organizations, such as the Alabama Christian Sports Conference and the Alabama Christian Athletic and Academic Association, sanction sports from smaller Christian schools and home schools, particularly in eight-man football.

The current executive director is Alvin Briggs.

Championship locations

The AHSAA sponsors state championship events in various locations across the state of Alabama.  Currently, championships are held in the following locations:

 Football ("Super 7") alternates in a three stadium rotation between Protective Stadium in Birmingham, Bryant–Denny Stadium in Tuscaloosa, and Jordan–Hare Stadium in Auburn 
 Basketball – Legacy Arena, Birmingham
 Baseball – Paterson Field & Riverwalk Stadium, Montgomery
 Cross Country – Oakville Indian Mounds, Lawrence County
 Indoor Track and Field – Birmingham Crossplex, Birmingham
 Softball – Lagoon Park, Montgomery
 Soccer – John Hunt Park, Huntsville
 Swimming – James E. Martin Aquatics Center, Auburn
 Tennis – Decatur, Mobile, and Montgomery
 Outdoor Track and Field – Gulf Shores
 Volleyball – Birmingham CrossPlex, Birmingham
 Wrestling – Von Braun Center, Huntsville (traditional tournament); Bill Harris Arena at the Birmingham CrossPlex, Birmingham (duals tournament)
 Cheerleading – Wallace State Community College, Hanceville

History
The AHSAA was founded in 1921. Charter member schools were:

 Abbeville
 Albany
 Aliceville
 Andalusia
 Auburn
 Baldwin County
 Barton Academy
 Bessemer City
 Bibb County
 Buhl
 Carrollton
 Chambers County
 Charles Henderson
 Chilton County
 Clio
 Coffeeville
 Colbert County
 Conecuh County
 Cullman
 Dadeville
 Demopolis
 Dothan
 Elmore County
 Enterprise
 Escambia County
 Evergreen
 Fayette County
 Geneva County
 Georgiana
 Gordo
 Greensboro
 Greenville
 Guntersville
 Hackleburg
 Hamilton
 Headland
 Highland Home
 Jackson
 Lamar County
 Lauderdale County
 Lincoln
 Lowndes County
 Marbury
 Marengo County
 Marion County
 Monroe County
 Mortimer Jordan
 Munford
 Notasulga
 Oneonta
 Opelika
 Oxford
 Palmetto School
 Pell City
 Phillips (Birmingham)
 Pickens County
 Pike Road
 Prattville
 Ramer
 Russellville
 Selma
 Shelby County
 Sidney Lanier
 Simpson
 Spring Hill
 Springville
 St. Clair County
 Sylacauga
 Tarrant
 Thomasville
 Tuskegee
 UMS-Wright
 Uniontown
 Valley
 Wagarville
 Walker
 Winston County

(Italicized schools indicate schools which have closed or are no longer members of the AHSAA.)

See also
List of Alabama High School Athletic Association championships
 NFHS

References

External links
 Alabama High School Athletic Association

Sports organizations established in 1921
 
High school sports associations in the United States
1921 establishments in Alabama